A.N.M Shamsul Islam (born 1 March 1957) is a Bangladeshi politician. He is a former Jatiya Sangsad member representing the Chittagong-15 constituency. 
At present he is the president of Bangladesh Sramik Kalyan Federation.
He was the acting amir of Bangladesh Jamaat-e-Islami.

Early life
He was born on 1 March 1957 in Chittagong District Under
Satkania Upazila at Barodona Village. His father's name Mohammad Ali Miah and mother's name is Hafeza Amena Khatun. His father was a government employee and mother was a Hafez of the Quran. He has 6 siblings.

Political and professional life 
Shamsul Islam was closely connected to political and social activities from his student life. He was the elected president of Bangladesh Islami Chhattra Shibir, Chittagong North Zone, in 1978. He was the president of Chittagong University Zone of Bangladesh Islami Chhattra Shibir from October 1981 to September 1985. He was elected central secretary general of Bangladesh Islami Chhattra Shibir in 1985, and central president in 1987.

He handled numerous social services and security programs beginning in 1989. Besides professional activities, he joined Bangladesh Jamaat-e-Islami . He was the elected Secretary of Chittagong city Zone of Bangladesh Jamaat-e-Islami. He had to go to jail because of his movement against autocracy in 1999. He was the elected Ameer of Chittagong city Zone of Bangladesh Jamaat-e-Islami from 2000. He was elected as member of parliament in National election of 2008 at Chittagong-14 (Satkania-Lohagara)

He is the candidate for Chittagong-15 (Satkania-Lohagara) in the national election of 30 December 2018.

Imprisonment 
He was sent to prison for the conspiracy of government party three times in last few years. He spent more than two and half year in prison.

Contribution 
Shamsul Islam is the chairman of the board of trustees of International Islamic University, Chittagong, and is now the senior vice chairman of the board of trustees of Chittagong International Medical College and Hospital.

Present activities 
He is the president of Bangladesh Sramik Kalyan Federation.
He was the acting Ameer of Bangladesh Jamaat-e-Islam.

References 

Bangladesh Jamaat-e-Islami politicians
1957 births
Living people
9th Jatiya Sangsad members
People from Satkania Upazila
University of Chittagong alumni
University of Dhaka alumni